The Martha Poe Dogtrot House, also known as Mayhar Plantation Stage Stop, in Thomas County, Georgia near Metcalf, Georgia, was built c.1850-1876.  It is a dog trot house which is believed to have served as a stage stop.

It was built with two hewn log pens covered by a single roof, with a breezeway space in between, but the breezeway was later enclosed.

The house with four acres of land was bought in 1876 by Martha Poe, an African-American woman, from William Vaughn for $24.  She later purchased an additional acre for $5.

Modifications in c.1946 added two brick chimneys to the two ends of the house, replaced flooring, and added a frame storage barn.

References

Houses on the National Register of Historic Places in Georgia (U.S. state)
Houses in Thomas County, Georgia
Houses completed in 1850
National Register of Historic Places in Thomas County, Georgia